Burton & Taylor is a BBC Four TV film directed by Richard Laxton, and based on the legendary acting duo and former husband and wife, Richard Burton and Elizabeth Taylor, during their preparation for a 1983 theatrical production of the play, Private Lives. The film stars Helena Bonham Carter and Dominic West in the title roles.

Plot
In 1983, ageing movie stars Richard Burton (Dominic West) and Elizabeth Taylor (Helena Bonham Carter) are in New York City preparing to perform the Noël Coward play, Private Lives. The pair have been married and divorced twice before, but remain friends despite tensions. She still dreams of a reconciliation. However, Richard is currently attached to his younger girlfriend Sally Hay and this makes Elizabeth jealous.

Richard suffers from poor health and is a recovering alcoholic, but Elizabeth continues to drink excessively and abuse prescription medication. During the play's rehearsal period, she makes the process difficult. While he is in his element and receives praise, she suffers from a lack of confidence. Realising she is frightened, Richard promises to support her through the show's run and he helps keep her pill addiction in check.

People flock to see the two celebrities on stage when Private Lives opens at the Lunt-Fontaine Theatre. The initial reviews are less than positive and Richard is uncomfortable when he realises that aspects of the play are a little too similar to their real lives. He proposes cancelling the show altogether, but Elizabeth (who is also the producer) refuses to quit.

Despite her wish to see the play through, Elizabeth continues to prove challenging; she arrives late for shows, brings all her pets along and mugs for the audience. Richard's patience wears thin and they eventually have a fight that comes to blows. After they apologise to one another, he invites her to have dinner. She accepts.

At dinner, the former lovers fondly recall their younger and wilder days. Elizabeth then wants to talk about their current relationship. Richard steers the conversation towards work. Furious that he's discounting her feelings, she storms out of the restaurant.

In retaliation for his behaviour, Elizabeth doesn't show up for the next night's show. Her absence hurts the show's success so greatly that the theater puts the play on hold until she returns. During the break, Richard and Sally get married in Las Vegas without telling anyone. Elizabeth finds out by reading a newspaper and has an emotional breakdown. Her assistant accuses Richard of intentionally breaking Elizabeth's heart. Emotionally drained, he barely resists the urge to binge drink again.

After the play's run ends, Richard confronts Elizabeth about her drug abuse, which she begrudgingly acknowledges. They both admit to still loving one another, but he says that being with her will destroy him. They agree to remain friends and stay in touch.

Shortly thereafter, Elizabeth enters the Betty Ford Center for treatment. Richard and Sally live in Switzerland until he dies of a cerebral hemorrhage in 1984. Richard and Elizabeth talk on the phone every few days during the last months of his life.

Cast
 Helena Bonham Carter as Elizabeth Taylor
 Dominic West as Richard Burton
 William Hope as John Cullum
 Michael Jibson as Mike
 Lenora Crichlow as Chen Sam
 Sarah Hadland as Kathryn Walker
 Stanley Townsend as Milton Katselas
 Greg Hicks as Zev Buffman

Production
The film was mainly shot in  Chiswick and Tower Hamlets, with filming lasting only 18 days. Bonham Carter visited an astrologer whilst preparing for her role as Elizabeth Taylor as she wanted a different take on Taylor's character and persona. Bonham Carter and West both have mentioned in interviews that they listened to numerous recordings of the stars, as well as reading books such as Furious Love by Sam Kashner and Nancy Schoenberger. West even visited the birthplace of Burton in attempt to discover more about the actor.

Costume designer Susannah Buxton only recreated two of Taylor's outfits, the gown worn during Private Lives and Taylor's birthday dress. The rest of the clothes Buxton created for Bonham Carter to wear were made from freelance tailors based on Bonham Carter's interpretation of the character, and designed to tone her look down subtly so it did not distract. Though Taylor was known for her jewellery, Buxton did not design much jewelry for Bonham Carter as she was afraid it would distract the audience if she wore as much as Taylor did. Therefore, she only copied two pieces of jewellery Taylor was known for, a Cartier bracelet and a pair of diamond earrings. For Dominic West as Richard Burton, Buxton sourced vintage suits and made one that would lend Burton's silhouette to West. As West was much younger during the filming than Burton was during the events portrayed, West's clothing ensembles had to be chosen in order to give him the "same strong, masculine and distinguished air" as Burton, such as double-breasted suits to broaden West's shoulders and accentuate his height.

Reception
In its original airing on BBC Four, Burton & Taylor received an impressive 1.13 million viewers.

The film received critical acclaim. On Rotten Tomatoes, the film has an approval rating of 100%, based on 11 reviews, with an average score of 9.3/10. At Metacritic, which assigns a rating out of 100 to reviews from mainstream critics, the film received an average score of 81, based on 17 reviews, which indicates "universal acclaim". Both Bonham Carter and West received widespread praise for their performances in the film, with Alex Hardy of The Times labelling the drama as "perfect" and added of Bonham Carter's performance as Taylor, "(She) conducted the world around her in a sing-song voice that moved octaves within one phrase, the fragile sliding into the manipulative". Sam Wollaston of The Guardian wrote "Bonham Carter and West are excellent. There's a crackle between them... They become two people who clearly are and always will be in love, but can never be together, for reasons of health and safety. It is another very good double act".

The actor Robert Hardy, who was an old friend of Burton's, was not impressed by West's performance, saying, "He was hopeless. He wasn’t tough enough, he wasn’t dangerous enough, he wasn’t Welsh enough." However, he appreciated Bonham Carter's performance, saying, "She was brilliant, absolutely brilliant. She got the spirit of her and sounded like her."

Awards and nominations

References

External links
 

2013 television films
2013 films
British television films
Films set in New York City
Films shot in England
Films set in 1983
Films about Elizabeth Taylor
Cultural depictions of Richard Burton
Films shot in London
2010s English-language films
Films directed by Richard Laxton